Novgorodka is a rural locality (a selo) and the administrative center of Novgorodsky Selsoviet of Svobodnensky District, Amur Oblast, Russia. The population is 749 as of 2018.

Geography 
The village is located 10 km from Svobodny.

References 

Rural localities in Svobodnensky District